Deurze is a village in the Dutch province of Drenthe. It is a part of the municipality of Aa en Hunze, and lies about 4 km southeast of Assen.

History 
The village was first mentioned in 1259 as "curtem Durse". The etymology is unclear.  In 1258,  awarded former possessions of the monastery , who moved to Assen, to Hako Stevenzoon van Hardenberg. The lands would become known as Deurze. There was a wind mill, however it was destroyed by Christoph Bernhard von Galen, the Prince-Bishop of Münster in 1672 who had built a sconce near the village for his failed invasion of the Netherlands.

Deurze was home to 58 people in 1840.

Transportation
There is no railway station here. The nearest station is Assen station. The nearest bus stop is about 1 km north of the centre at which the services 10, 21, 24 and 28 stop.

For further information see Aa en Hunze#Transportation.

References

Populated places in Drenthe
Aa en Hunze